Charles Ready Haskell was killed in the Goliad massacre.  There is a town and a county, both named Haskell in Texas named after him.

Haskell was a native of Tennessee.

References

People from Texas
1836 deaths
Year of birth missing
Haskell County, Texas